The City of Westminster contains many of the most famous tourist sites in London.

Covent Garden
 London Transport Museum
 Royal Opera House

Hyde Park
 Serpentine Galleries
 Speakers' Corner
 Hyde Park Corner
 Apsley House
 Wellington Arch

Marylebone
 Madame Tussauds
 Oxford Street
 Selfridges
 Sherlock Holmes Museum
 Wallace Collection
 All Souls Church, Langham Place

Mayfair
 Handel & Hendrix in London
 Royal Academy of Arts
 Burlington Arcade
 Royal Institution

Millbank
 Tate Britain

Regent’s Park
 London Zoo

St James’s
 Buckingham Palace
 Queen's Gallery
 Royal Mews
 Fortnum & Mason
 St James's Palace

St John’s Wood
 Abbey Road Studios
 Lord's Cricket Ground

Soho
 Benjamin Franklin House
 Carnaby Street
 Leicester Square
 Piccadilly Circus
 London Pavilion
 Regent Street
 Hamleys
 Liberty's
 Trafalgar Square
 National Gallery
 National Portrait Gallery
 Nelson's Column
 St Martin-in-the-Fields

South Kensington
 Albert Memorial
 Royal Albert Hall

Strand
 Royal Courts of Justice
 Savoy Hotel
 Somerset House
 Courtauld Gallery
 St Mary le Strand
 St Clement Danes

Victoria
 Westminster Cathedral

Victoria Embankment
 Cleopatra's Needle

Westminster
 Palace of Westminster (Houses of Parliament)
 Big Ben
 Jewel Tower
 Westminster Abbey
 Westminster Abbey Museum
 St Margaret's, Westminster
 Methodist Central Hall Westminster

Whitehall
 Banqueting House
 Churchill War Rooms
 The Cenotaph
 Clarence House
 Downing Street
 Horse Guards Parade
 The Guards Museum

Buildings and structures in the City of Westminster
Tourist sites
Tourism in London
Westminster
Westminster